Hans Christian Blech (20 February 19155 March 1993) was a German film, stage and television character actor who found success in both Germany and Hollywood.

He made his English film debut in the 1951 picture Decision Before Dawn. In this and many of his other Hollywood films, he played a German soldier. He had a prominent role in the 1962 World War 2 blockbuster film, The Longest Day. He served in the German Army and fought on the Eastern Front in World War II, where he may have acquired his facial scars. Another possible origin of his scars was a car accident on the Darmstadt Luisenplatz when Blech was 14 years old.

Partial filmography

Blum Affair (1948), as Karlheinz Gabler
The Orplid Mystery (1950), as Martin Jarzombeck, Bräutigam
Decision Before Dawn (1951), as Sgt. Rudolf Barth aka Tiger
Sauerbruch – Das war mein Leben (1954), as Brauer 
 Confession Under Four Eyes (1954), as Tscheche
08/15 (1954), as Wachtmeister Platzek
The Phantom of the Big Tent (1954), as Naso, Clown mit Puppe
Children, Mother, and the General (1955), as Feldwebel mit den Orden
 (1955), as Wachtmeister Platzek
Bandits of the Autobahn (1955), as Willi Kollanski
 (1955), as Wachtmeister Platzek
 (1956), as Heinze
Un homme se penche sur son passé (1958), as Archer
 (1958), as Dr. Laue
 (1960), as Oberarzt Dr. Neugebauer
The Inheritance of Bjorndal (1960), as Aslak, Gunvor's Husband
Enclosure (1961), as Karl
The Longest Day (1962), as Major Werner Pluskat
The Visit (1964), as Captain Dobrik
Morituri (1965), as Donkeyman
Battle of the Bulge (1965), as Conrad
La Voleuse (1966), as Radek Kostrowicz
The Bridge at Remagen (1969), as Capt. Carl Schmidt
Cardillac (1969), as Cardillac 
The Customer of the Off Season (1970), as Hotel Manager
The Scarlet Letter (1973), as Roger Chillingworth
Giordano Bruno (1973), as Sartori
Le Hasard et la Violence (1974) (uncredited)
La Chair de l'orchidée (1975), as Gyula Berekian
The Wrong Move (1975), as Laertes
Innocents with Dirty Hands (1975), as Judge
 (1975), as Ritter
The Clown (1976), as Derkum
 (1976), as Frank
Grete Minde (1977), as Gigas
 (1977), as Sellman
Knife in the Head (1978), as Anleitner
Winterspelt (1979), as Wenzel Hainstock
 (1979, TV miniseries), as Theodor Chindler
Victoria (1979), as Tutor 
See You in the Next War (1980), as Bitter
 (1981), as Johnny
 (1981, TV film), as Wilhelm Urack
The Magic Mountain (1982), as Hofrat Behrens
Satan ist auf Gottes Seite (1983, TV film), as C.
Colonel Redl (1985), as von Roden
Via Mala (1985, TV miniseries), as Maler Lauters
 (1986, TV film), as Langenau
The Cry of the Owl (1987, TV film), as Dr. Knapp
The Play with Billions (1989, TV film), as Falk Schönwald
Mit den Clowns kamen die Tränen (1990, TV miniseries), as Alwin Westen
Magyar rekviem (1990), as Tanár úr
 (1990), as Svoboda
 (1990, TV film), as Erich Honecker
 (1991), as Pfarrer Nothsack
 (1992, TV film), as Richard

References

External links

1915 births
1993 deaths
German male film actors
German male stage actors
German male television actors
German Army personnel of World War II
Actors from Darmstadt
People from the Grand Duchy of Hesse
20th-century German male actors
German expatriate male actors in the United States